is a Japanese actor. He specializes in jidaigeki roles, and has also taken parts in tokusatsu and modern productions.

Career
Born in Rikuzentakata, Iwate Prefecture, he enrolled in Hosei University but withdrew when he successfully auditioned for a part in Kamen Rider. He made his debut as Hiroshi Tsukuba in Skyrider.

Hiroaki appeared in a lot of jidaigeki television dramas. He appeared the NHK jidaigeki On'yado Kawasemi in 1980–81, and in a new series Shin On'yado Kawasemi in 1997. He appeared in Hissatsu series Hissatsu Shigotonin V as the florist-turned-blacksmith named Masa, and as a repeating character in Series and popularity.

Five Taiga drama roles are among his credits. They are in Haru no Hatō (1985), Kōsaka Masanobu in Takeda Shingen (1988), Fujiwara no Kiyohira in Homura Tatsu (1993), Akechi Mitsuhide in Hideyoshi (1996), and Yanagisawa Yoshiyasu in Genroku Ryōran (1999). In the annual TV Tokyo New Year's spectacular, he portrayed Sasaki Kojirō in Miyamoto Musashi (1990), Kira no Nikichi in Jirōchō Sangokushi (1991), Yagyū Jūbei in Tokugawa Bugeichō Yagyū Sandai no Ken (1993), and Araki Mataemon in Tenka Sōran Tokugawa Sandai no Inbō (2006). Among the jidaigeki series he has starred in are Hatchōbori no Shichinin (2000–06), Zenigata Heiji (2004–05), Yagyū Jūbei Nanaban Shōbu (2005–07), and Shikaku Ukeoinin (2007). Additionally, he portrayed Oda Nobunaga in Taikōki Tenka o Neratta Otoko: Hideyoshi (2006).)

He has appeared in more than fifteen films, including several in the Kamen Rider and Hissatsu franchises. Further films to his credit include Gokudō no Onnatachi 2, Juliet Game, and Iron Maze (In a Grove).

Filmography

Film
No More Easy Life (1979)
8 Kamen Riders vs. Galaxy King (1980) as Sky Rider
Jerashî gêmu (1982) as Eiji Haga
Shonben raidâ (1983) as Kinta
Hissatsu! Buraun-kan no kaibutsutachi (1985) as Masa the florist
Hissatsu! III Ura ka Omote ka (1986)
Purushian burû no shôzô (1986)
Let's Gôtoku-ji! (1987)
Sure Death 4: Revenge (1987) as Masa
Gokudo no onna-tachi 2 (1987) as Ryoji Kimoto
Ikidomari no Banka: Brake out (1988) as Koji Nishimura
Juliet Game (1989) as Masahiko
Iron Maze (1991) as Sugita
Hissatsu!5 Ōgon no Chi (1991)
Hissatsu! Mondo Shisu (1996)
17sai tabidachi no futari (2003)
Shibuya monogatari (2005) as Noboru Ando
Tannka (2005) as M
Daichi no uta (2011)
Love for Beginners (2012) as Keita Tsubaki
Kyôryû wo horô! (2013)
Idainaru, Shurarabon (2014)
Bannou kanteishi Q: Mona Riza no hitomi (2014)
Usogui: Lie Eater (2022) as Hikoichi Yakō
Kamaishi Ramen Monogatari (2023)
Shasen Henkō (TBA)

Television
Kamen Rider Skyrider (1979) as Hiroshi Tsukuba / Sky Rider
On'yado Kawasemi (1980-1983)
Hissatsu Shigotonin V (1985) as Hanaya no Masa
Hissatsu Shigotonin V Gekitouhen (1986) as Kajiya no Masa
Hissatsu Shigotonin V Senpuhen (1986-1987) as Masa
Hissatsu Shigotonin V Fuunryūkohen (1987) as Masa
Takeda Shingen (1988) as Kōsaka Masanobu
Homura Tatsu (1993)
Hideyoshi (1996) as Akechi Mitsuhide
Shinsengumi Keppūroku (1998) as Toshizo Hijikata
Nene: Onna Taikōki (2009)
Yae no Sakura (2013)
24 Japan (2020) as Heisuke Satonaka
Miss Kuroitsu from the Monster Development Department (2022) as Narrator (episode 2)

References

External links
Official site

Murakami Hiroaki at JMDB

Japanese male actors
1956 births
Living people
Actors from Iwate Prefecture
Taiga drama lead actors